Joshua Arana Hill (born 22 April 1999) is a New Zealand rugby union player who plays for  in the National Provincial Championship (NPC). His playing position is lock.

Early life
Hill attended South Otago High School in Balclutha where he was deputy head boy and was the school's first XV captain. In 2017, he formed part of a national under-18 Māori team.

Hill has played club rugby for Otago University RFC.

Rugby career
He made his debut in a 37–20 win against  on 30 August that year. He would go on to play 5 matches in his maiden season.

Hill made 6 appearances for the Otago Razorbacks in the 2020 Mitre 10 Cup season and, as of 2021, continues to play for Otago. He scored his first Otago try in a 44–16 away semifinal win against Manawatu on 12 November 2021.

Personal life
Hill pertains to the Ngāi Tahu and Ngāpuhi Māori iwi.

Super Rugby statistics

Reference list

External links
Itsrugby.co.uk profile

New Zealand rugby union players
Living people
Rugby union locks
Otago rugby union players
People educated at South Otago High School
1999 births
Ngāi Tahu people
Ngāpuhi people
New Zealand Māori rugby union players
Melbourne Rebels players